Sidney Arthur Kilworth Keyes (27 May 1922 – 29 April 1943) was an English poet of World War II.

Life

Early years and education 
Keyes was born on 27 May 1922. His mother died shortly afterwards and he was raised by his paternal grandparents. Keyes started writing poetry when still very young, with Wordsworth, Rilke and Jung among his main influences. He attended Dartford Grammar School and then boarded at Tonbridge School (Hillside, 1935-1940) during his secondary education, after which he won a history scholarship to Queen's College, Oxford. While at college, Keyes wrote the only two books of his lifetime, The Cruel Solstice and The Iron Laurel. During his time in Oxford, Keyes fell in love with the young German artist Milein Cosman, but his love was not returned. He also befriended fellow poets John Heath-Stubbs and Michael Meyer, edited The Cherwell magazine, and formed a dramatic society.

The Iron Laurel was published during World War II in 1942, when Keyes was 20 years old. His poetry was also published in the New Statesman, The Listener and other poetry journals.

Military service 
Keyes left Oxford and joined the British Army in April 1942, entering active service that same year. He was soon commissioned in the Queens Own Royal West Kent Regiment and served with his regiment's 1st Battalion, part of the 4th Division, to fight in the final stages of the Tunisian campaign in March 1943. Prior to his service, Keyes had already written more than half of the 110 poems that would later be gathered in The Collected Poems of Sidney Keyes. During combat, he was reported to have continued writing poetry. However, these works have not survived.

Death 
Keyes was killed in action on 29 April 1943, covering his platoon's retreat during a counter-attack, shortly before his 21st birthday. It has also been stated that he died at the hands of the enemy, following his capture.

Recognition 
In 1943, Keyes was awarded the Hawthornden Prize for The Cruel Solstice and The Iron Laurel. He has been described as one of the outstanding poets of the Second World War.

Footnotes

Bibliography 
 
 
 
 
 
 
 Roy, Pinaki. “Sidney Keyes: The War-poet who ‘groped for Death’”. War, Literature and the Arts (U.S. Air Force Academy) (ISSN 2169-7914), 26 (1), 2014: http://wlajournal.com/wlaarchive/26/Roy.pdf

External links
 

1922 births
1943 deaths
British Army personnel killed in World War II
People educated at Tonbridge School
Alumni of The Queen's College, Oxford
World War II poets
20th-century male writers
20th-century English poets
Queen's Own Royal West Kent Regiment officers